Love's Greatest Mistake is a 1927 American silent drama film directed by A. Edward Sutherland and starring Evelyn Brent. The film is now lost.

Plot
Honey McNeil (Josephine Dunn) comes to New York expecting to have a rather dull time under her sister’s chaperonage. But when she walks in on her sister (Evelyn Brent) clasped in the arms of a man other than her husband, Honey complacently adopts the new standard, and plays around with the rich banker she has met on the train (Frank Morgan), to the distress of her poorer, but more sincere sweetheart (James Hall), who naturally mistrusts the really innocent friendship. This is Love’s greatest mistake—lack of faith.
The banker writes more or less incriminating letters, which Don Kendall (William Powell) seeks to obtain from Honey for blackmail purposes, but Honey has successfully hidden them. She saves the letters, though she goes to the hospital as a result of her encounter with Don.
Foiled of his prey, Don gives out a story to a tabloid and then arranges to elope with the sister. Honey, coming home to the empty flat, out of step with a sweetheart who clumsily offers to marry her “in spite of all,” turns to the banker, but changes her mind just in time and marries the right man.

Cast
 Evelyn Brent as Jane
 William Powell as Don Kendall
 James Hall as Harvey Gibbs
 Josephine Dunn as Honey McNeil
 Frank Morgan as William Ogden
 Iris Gray as Sara Foote
 Betty Byrne as Lovey Gibbs

References

External links

1927 films
1927 drama films
Silent American drama films
American silent feature films
American black-and-white films
Paramount Pictures films
Films directed by A. Edward Sutherland
Lost American films
1927 lost films
Lost drama films
1920s American films